The 2022 California Attorney General election was held on November 8, 2022, to elect the Attorney General of California. Incumbent Democratic Attorney General Rob Bonta was appointed to the office on April 23, 2021, following the resignation of Xavier Becerra to become the U.S. Secretary of Health and Human Services. Bonta won a full term.

Candidates
A primary election took place on June 7, 2022. Under California law, all candidates appear on the same ballot under a nonpartisan blanket primary, with the top two finishers advancing to the general election.

Democratic Party

Advanced
Rob Bonta, incumbent attorney general

Declined
Ellen Corbett, former state senator from the 10th district (2006–2014)
Jeffrey F. Rosen, Santa Clara County district attorney (2011–present)

Republican Party

Advanced
Nathan Hochman, former U.S. Assistant Attorney General

Eliminated 
Eric Early, candidate for attorney general in 2018, nominee for California's 28th congressional district in 2020

Green Party

Eliminated
Dan Kapelovitz, candidate for governor in the 2021 recall election

No party preference

Eliminated
Anne Marie Schubert, Sacramento County district attorney

Endorsements

Primary election

Polling

Results

General election

Predictions

Polling

Results

See also 
 2022 United States attorney general elections
 2022 California elections

Notes

References

External links 
Official campaign websites
 Rob Bonta (D) for Attorney General
 Nathan Hochman (R) for Attorney General

Attorney General
2022
California